The President and Vice-Chancellor of the University of British Columbia (UBC) serves as the administrative head of the institution. There have been fifteen people have served as  president in the history of the institution, including those that held the position on an interim basis, with Martha C. Piper serving twice as president.

They include:
 Frank Wesbrook (1913–1918) 
 Leonard Klinck (1919–1944) 
 Norman MacKenzie (1944–1962) 
 John B. Macdonald (1962–1967) 
 Fredrick Kenneth Hare (1968–1969) 
 Walter Harry Gage (1969–1975) 
 Douglas T. Kenny (1975–1983) 
 George Pedersen (1983–1985) 
 Robert H. T. Smith (1985, pro tem) 
 David W. Strangway (1985–1997) 
 Martha C. Piper (1997–2006) 
 Stephen J. Toope (2006–2014) 
 Arvind Gupta (2014–2015) 
 Martha C. Piper (2015–2016) 
 David H. Farrar (2016) 
 Santa J. Ono (2016–2022)

See also
 List of chancellors of the University of British Columbia
 List of University of British Columbia people

Notes

References

 
British Columbia